In the Battle of García Hernández on 23 July 1812, two brigades of Anglo-German cavalry led by Major-General Eberhardt Otto George von Bock defeated 4,000 French infantry led by Major-General Maximilien Foy. In what would otherwise have been an unremarkable Peninsular War skirmish, the German heavy dragoons achieved the unusual feat of breaking three French squares, those of the 6th, 69th and 76th Line, routing the entire French force with heavy losses.

Background

The previous day, the Allied army commanded by Arthur Wellesley, 1st Duke of Wellington had won a decisive victory over a French army led by Marshal Auguste Marmont in the Battle of Salamanca. Foy's division was the only French unit not engaged in the battle and it was acting as rearguard on 23 July.

Battle
Bock's 770-strong heavy cavalry brigade, consisting of the 1st and 2nd King's German Legion (KGL) Dragoons, led the pursuit of the French. In support of Bock were the 1,000 troopers of George Anson's British light cavalry brigade (11th and 16th Light Dragoons). As the Anglo-Germans approached, Maj-Gen Curto's French cavalry fled. Foy arranged his eight battalions on a hill in square near Garcihernández in Salamanca province in Spain. He had two battalions each of the 6th Light, and the 39th, 69th and 76th Line Infantry Regiments.

Bock's dragoons charged a square belonging to a battalion of the 6th Light. The French held their fire too long. Their volley killed a number of horsemen, but a mortally wounded horse carrying a dead dragoon crashed into the square like a battering ram. The horse fell, kicking wildly, knocking down at least six men and creating a gap in the square. Captain Gleichen rode his horse into the gap, followed by his troopers. The square broke up and most of the men surrendered.

A second square farther up the hillside was soon charged. Shaken by the first square's disaster, the men flinched when the dragoons rode into them. Soon the men in the second square were running for their lives, except those who surrendered. Foy quickly pulled back the rest of his troops. Anson's horsemen mopped up the battlefield.

Results
Foy lost 200 killed and wounded, and 1,400 captured. Bock lost 54 killed and 62 wounded. The very high proportion of killed to wounded was due to the "deadly effect of musketry at the closest possible quarters." Another authority gives 52 Germans killed, 69 wounded and 6 missing and 1,100 total French casualties.

Commentary
The breaking of a steady square was a rare event. A French infantry battalion in square formed up in a bayonet-studded hedgehog either 3-ranks or 6-ranks deep. (A British square was 4-deep.) If a square stood its ground without flinching and fired with effect, it could withstand the best cavalry. When infantry squares were broken by cavalry in the Napoleonic Wars, it was usually because:
 the infantry were of poor quality
 the infantry were tired, disorganized or discouraged
 it was raining, making it difficult for the infantry to fire effectively, and wetting their gunpowder
 the infantry fired a poorly aimed volley
 the infantry waited too long to fire

At García Hernández, the last event occurred with the first square, leading to the extraordinary accident of a mortally wounded horse and rider smashing into the square making a gap which was then exploited by the following cavalry. The second square likely panicked at seeing the first square being torn apart.

Culture
This skirmish is depicted in Bernard Cornwell's novel, Sharpe's Sword.

The battle was also shown in Susanna Clarke's Jonathan Strange and Mr. Norrell, while Jonathan Strange is serving under the Duke of Wellington.

Notes

References

External links
Google Earth view of Garcihernández

Further reading

External links
 Battle of Salamanca Original reports from The Times
 Dispatches: London Gazette 16 August 1812
 Details on battle of Salamanca
 Includes British and allied OOB
 The Cruel War in Spain – Armies, Battles, Skirmishes
 Batalla de los Arapiles (in Spanish)
 

Battles of the Peninsular War
Battles of the Napoleonic Wars
Battles involving the United Kingdom
Battles involving France
Battles involving Hanover
Battles in Castile and León
Battle of Garcia Hernandez
King's German Legion
Battle of Garcia Hernandez
July 1812 events
History of the province of Salamanca